The 2005 Cupa României Final was the 67th final of Romania's most prestigious cup competition. The final was played at the Stadionul Cotroceni in Bucharest on 11 May 2005 and was contested between Divizia A sides Dinamo București and Farul Constanţa. The cup was won by Dinamo.

Route to the final

Match details

References

External links
 Official site 

Cupa Romaniei Final, 2005
2004-05
2005